Narimantas or Narymunt (baptized Gleb; 1277 or just before 1300 (according to Wasilewski 1992) – 2 February 1348) was the second eldest son of Gediminas, Grand Duke of Lithuania. During various periods of his life, he ruled Pinsk and Polotsk. In 1333 he was invited by Novgorod's nobles to rule and protect territories in the north, Ladoga, Oreshek and Korela. He started the tradition of Lithuanian mercenary service north of Novgorod on the Swedish border that lasted until Novgorod's fall to Moscow in 1477.

About 1338, the Golden Horde took him as prisoner. The Muscovite ruler, Ivan Kalita, ransomed him from Tatars, keeping him as hostage in Moscow for a few years.

Narimantas supported his brother Jaunutis when he was deposed by Algirdas and Kęstutis in 1345. In order to avoid getting killed by his younger brothers, he escaped Vilnius in autumn 1344. Narimantas travelled to Jani Beg, Khan of the Golden Horde, asking for support against Algirdas. Though he failed to solicit support, he is rumoured to have married a Tatar princess (possibly as second wife). After returning, Narimantas reconciled with Algirdas and was killed leading the Battle of Strėva against the Teutonic Knights on 2 February 1348. His descendants include Princes Kurakin, Galitzine, Khovansky, Korecki.

He took baptism in 1333 in or before Veliki Novgorod. This made him ineligible to succeed his father as ruler of Lithuanians, despite his primogeniture right.

Sons 
It is believed that Narimantas had five sons:
 Aleksander (died after 1386), Prince of Podolia
 Yury (died in 1392), Prince of Belz
 Nikolai, Prince of Pinsk
 Patrikas (died ca. 1387), Prince of Starodub-Seversky
 Simeon (died after 1386)

The Polish genealogist and historian Józef Puzyna (see Dr. Jozef ks. Puzyna, article series on Narimantas, in: Miesiecznik Heraldyczny, 1930–31) refutes strongly the claim that Narimantas' progeny would have been born of a Tatar wife. He advances a hypothesis that the names of Narimantas' sons indicate that their mother was an Orthodox Ruthenian lady.

Other genealogists give as his wife Marija, daughter of Toqta (died c. 1312), khan of the Golden Horde, and wife Maria Palaiologina (born 1297), bastard daughter of Andronikos II Palaiologos, Emperor of Byzantium.

See also 
 Family of Gediminas – family tree of Narimantas
 Gediminids

References

 Sjöström (2011), Liettuan gediminidien suomensukuiset geneettiset juuret. ISSN 1239-3487, Donelaitis - Donelaitis-seuran - Liettuan Ystävät ryn lehti 1/2011, ss 16..18

13th-century births
1348 deaths
Gediminids
Military personnel killed in action